Haverford Fords may refer to:

Haverford College Fords, a member of the Division 3 Centennial Conference.
Haverford School Fords, the athletic teams of the all-boys private school outside of Philadelphia, especially known for excellence in squash, tennis, lacrosse, and swimming.